James Wallis (1825 – 25 May 1912) was a 19th-century Member of Parliament from Auckland, New Zealand.

Wallis was born in Aberdeenshire in 1825. He received his education at the University of Aberdeen, from where he graduated with a Master of Arts in 1844. He was a minister of the Presbyterian Church, and ministered in Scotland at Dundee and Aberdeen, and in British Guiana in Essequibo and Demerara. He went back for further study to become a medical missionary, and in 1863 was admitted as a member to the Royal College of Surgeons of Edinburgh. He travelled to New Zealand in 1865 via Africa and Australia.

In 1868, Wallis married Elizabeth Poole; she was the daughter of a physician from Edinburgh.

Wallis represented the Auckland West electorate from 1877 to 1881, when he was defeated. Of seven candidates, he came second to last. Wallis was a strong supporter of women's suffrage.

His wife died many years before him. A resident of Grey Lynn, he died on 25 May 1912. He was buried beside his wife at Waikumete Cemetery.

References

1825 births
1912 deaths
Alumni of the University of Aberdeen
Members of the New Zealand House of Representatives
Unsuccessful candidates in the 1881 New Zealand general election
Unsuccessful candidates in the 1890 New Zealand general election
New Zealand MPs for Auckland electorates
Burials at Waikumete Cemetery
People from Auckland
People from Aberdeenshire
Scottish emigrants to New Zealand
Christian medical missionaries
19th-century New Zealand politicians
19th-century Ministers of the Church of Scotland